Enemy of the State is the sixth studio album by American rapper C-Bo, released July 11, 2000 on C-Bo's own label West Coast Mafia Records and Warlock Records. It peaked at number 24 on the Billboard Top R&B/Hip-Hop Albums and at number 91 on the Billboard 200. Enemy of the State was C-Bo's first album on his new label, West Coast Mafia, after leaving AWOL Records, which he did after the release of Til My Casket Drops. The album features guest performances by WC, Daz Dillinger, Killa Tay, Yukmouth, CJ Mac and Too Short. Along with a single, a music video was produced for the song, "Get The Money".

Track listing
"Enemy of the State"
"Crippin'" (featuring Daz Dillinger)
"Death Rider's"
"Paper Made"
"Get The Money"
"4.6" (featuring Killa Tay)
"It's War" (featuring Little Keek & Yukmouth)
"Forever Thuggin' (featuring Dotty)
"Ride Til' We Die" (featuring WC)
"Nothin' over My G's" (featuring JT the Bigga Figga & Killa Tay)
"Spray Yourself" (featuring Yukmouth)
"C and the Mac" (featuring CJ Mac)
"Picture Me Ballin'"
"Born Killaz" (featuring Mob Figaz)
"Pimpin' and Jackin'" (featuring Too Short)
"Tycoon"
"No Surrender, No Retreat" (featuring Mob Figaz)
"Here We Come, Boy!"

Chart history

References

External links 
 Enemy of the State at Discogs
 Enemy of the State at MusicBrainz

2000 albums
C-Bo albums
Warlock Records albums
Albums produced by Mike Dean (record producer)
Albums produced by Rick Rock